The blue-tufted starthroat (Heliomaster furcifer) is a species of hummingbird in the "mountain gems", tribe Lampornithini in subfamily Trochilinae. It is found in Argentina, Bolivia, Brazil, Colombia, Paraguay, Peru, Uruguay and possibly Ecuador.

Taxonomy and systematics

At one time the blue-tufted starthroat was the only species in genus Heliomaster, but since the mid-1900s three other species have been reassigned to it. The blue-tufted starthroat is monotypic.

Description

Both sexes of all subspecies have a long, decurved, black bill and a small white spot behind the eye. Both have a forked tail but the female's is less deeply indented than the male's. Males in breeding plumage have an emerald green crown, nape, and upper back; the rest of the upperparts are shining coppery green. The throat is glittering violet. The underparts and elongated feathers on the sides of the neck are iridescent ultramarine. The tail is dark green on its upper side and blue-green below. Non-breeding males are grayish below like females. Females have coppery green upperparts. The throat and underparts are gray, with a white line down the middle of the belly and green spots on the flanks. The tail is bronze green above with black tips on the central feathers; it is shining blue-green below with white tips on the outer feathers.

Distribution and habitat

The core of the blue-tufted starthroat's range is eastern Bolivia, southern Brazil, Paraguay, northern Argentina, and northern Uruguay. It has also been documented in Colombia and Peru and has one undocumented sight record in Ecuador. It inhabits open landscapes such as forest edges, cerrado, and grasslands.

Behavior

Movement

The blue-tufted starthroat's movement pattern is poorly known. The records out of its core range and some at the edges of it might indicate some post-breeding migration or dispersal.

Feeding

The blue-tufted starthroat feeds on nectar from a wide variety of flowering plants. It is one of the major pollinators of Dolichandra cynanchoides, a flowering vine. Males defend flower patches. In addition to nectar, it also feeds on small insects captured by hawking.

Breeding

The blue-tufted starthroat's breeding season spans from November to March. The female incubates the clutch of two eggs for 15 to 16 days and fledging occurs 20 to 25 days after hatch.

Vocalization

The blue-tufted starthroat does not appear to have a conventional song. It does make "a descending, pure-whistled 'tseep'" call.

Status

The IUCN has assessed the blue-tufted starthroat as being of Least Concern, though its population size is unknown and believed to be decreasing. No immediate threats have been identified. It is considered rare to locally common at various parts of its large range and occurs in some protected areas.

References

External links
Photo at VIREO

Heliomaster
Birds of Argentina
Birds of Bolivia
Birds of Brazil
Birds of Colombia
Birds of Paraguay
Birds of Uruguay
Hummingbird species of South America
Birds described in 1812
Taxonomy articles created by Polbot